The Vectron is a locomotive series made by Siemens Mobility, introduced at the 2010 InnoTrans trade fair in four prototype versions: diesel, multi-system, and both AC and DC electric power. The diesel version has been replaced in 2018 by a dual mode locomotive which is powered by electricity on electrified sections of the track and can be switched to diesel mode on non-electrified sections. The Vectron series is reconfigurable and modular, with a Bo'Bo' wheel arrangement, and is intended as the successor to the EuroSprinter family of locomotives. A more affordable, basic version called Smartron was introduced in 2018.

Background and design
Around the end of the 20th century and the beginning of the 21st century Siemens successfully produced freight and passenger/universal versions of its EuroSprinter locomotive platform; initially made as single voltage machines for European state railways (Austria, Germany), later as multivoltage locomotives for cross border working; this design resulted in numerous orders from both state and private railways, as well as rail leasing companies, primarily in the European Union area.

Siemens identified the potential for further growth in the market, particularly in trans-Alpine freight (Northern Europe to Italy), railfreight from northern European ports into Europe and from Baltic ports into Russia, as well as the potential for growth in newer members of the European Union (Poland, Hungary etc.).

The design incorporates elements from previous Siemens locomotives—the train control package and traction control system are from the ES64F4 and ES64U4 Eurosprinter models respectively, whilst traction system is derived from the ER20 EuroRunner. The cab and replaceable front end (buffer-bar) derives from the latest Eurosprinter model i.e. locomotives such as the Portuguese CP Class 4700 or Belgian SNCB Class 18.

Design
The Vectron is designed to be easily reconfigurable to a variety of country or work specific configurations; reconfiguration to different safety systems is simplified with pre-designed mounting points for track equipment, modular safety equipment cabinets in the locomotive body and a driver's desk designed for a wide variety of information equipment.

The locomotives are also available in a medium power version for regional passenger and medium freight work as well as a high power version. DC only versions are only available in medium power. Since 2022, the locomotive can also be ordered with a top speed of 230 km/h.

The main body of the vehicle is self-supporting, consisting of an underframe of three longitudinal sill plates (centre and sides), side walls, transverse support members for the bogie pivots and for the transformer, and end sill plates. The roof is in three sections and is removable, and the two driver's cabins also have a replaceable front end. The buffer beam section is also a separate part, which allows replacement if it is damaged in a collision.

The main compartment of the locomotive contains the electrical equipment except the main transformer and batteries which are located below the frame. All electrical components are placed in predefined locations on either side of a central aisle connecting the two cabins with each mounting position being reserved for a single type of equipment.

The bogies transmit tractive force through a central pivot. The traction motors are flexibly supported by the bogie frame, and are connected to the wheelset mounted reduction gears by a multiple disc coupling. A full hollow shaft (folded cardan) drive system is also optional. Mechanical braking is via wheel-mounted disc brakes. Electrical regenerative braking is also used.

The locomotives can work in double, multiple and push-pull formation with other Vectron, Eurosprinter and Eurorunner locomotives as well as some other locomotives fitted with the same multiple working equipment. The design also allows single cab version for use in permanent double coupled locomotive working or for use with passenger trains with a blanking module replacing one of the cab ends.

Diesel engined versions

A fully diesel powered version was launched in 2010.

An electric locomotive design with 180 kW diesel engine for shunting operations was presented at the 2012 Innotrans trade fair.

In 2018, a dual mode locomotive was presented as a combination of electric and diesel locomotive. The new locomotive weighs 90 metric tons. The locomotive is designed to operate on a 15-kV AC electrical system and is equipped with the PZB train protection system. Regardless of its operating mode, the locomotive develops a rating of 2,000 kW at the wheel rim. The Vectron's diesel tank holds 2,500 liters of fuel. The locomotive's top speed is 160 km/h.

Operations

Introduction and testing
The first locomotives of the type were AC and multisystem locomotives presented at the Wegberg-Wildenrath Test and Validation Centre in June 2010. AC, DC, multivoltage electric system and a diesel engined version were officially launched at the 2010 Innotrans trade fair.

The Vectron design received certification to operate in Romania in 2012, the DC Vectron version also was homologated for use in Poland in 2012, and the design received European community certification for inter-operability on high-speed rail systems. (EC Decisions 2002/735/EC and 2008/232/CE)

Certification for use of the AC version in Germany was obtained in December 2012, as part of joint certification procedure between Germany, Austria, Switzerland, Italy and the Netherlands.
 
Over the night of 25–26 January 2013, a modified Vectron locomotive was tested in the Channel Tunnel.

Certification for use in Austria was obtained in early 2013. Full certification for use in Sweden was obtained in April 2013, replacing a temporary certificate.

The AC version received certification for Hungary in late 2013. In January 2014 the Vectron locomotive class received certification under the EU 'Technical specification for interoperability for Locomotives and Passenger rolling stock' (Decision 2011/291/EU), and in July 2014 the AC version was certified for use in Norway.

The locomotives were released for operation in Turkey in November 2014. Preliminary certifications for some multisystem locomotives in the Czech Republic and Slovakia followed. A preliminary certification for some DC version locomotives in the Czech Republic was reported shortly after. The permanent authorizations for the MS and AC versions were granted in March 2015 for the Czech Republic and in May 2015 for Slovakia. In July 2015, the DC version was homologated for Italy. Since August 2015, the MS version is homologated for Poland. The homologation for Croatia and Slovenia was published in September 2015. Since February 2017, the MS version is homologated for Italy.

A Siemens press release on the occasion of 500 sold locomotives revealed that homologations also exist for Bulgaria, Serbia and Switzerland. The MS version was homologated for the Netherlands in September 2017.

The diesel engined version Vectron DE is homologated for use in Germany since September 2014, for use in Turkey since November 2014 and for use in Austria since August 2015.

Homologation overview
Homologations which cannot be clearly assigned to the locomotive's electric system were assumed on the basis of neighboring countries and current systems and are given in brackets in the following table.

Orders

See also
Amtrak Cities Sprinter, Siemens' electric locomotive deriving from Eurosprinter and Vectron designs
List of České dráhy locomotive classes
Siemens Charger, Siemens' diesel locomotive based on the ACS-64 and Vectron

References

External links

Siemens locomotives
Multi-system locomotives
Standard gauge locomotives of Austria
Standard gauge locomotives of Bulgaria
Standard gauge locomotives of the Czech Republic
Standard gauge locomotives of Germany
Standard gauge locomotives of Hungary
Standard gauge locomotives of Italy
Standard gauge locomotives of the Netherlands
Standard gauge locomotives of Poland
Standard gauge locomotives of Romania
Standard gauge locomotives of Slovakia
Standard gauge locomotives of Sweden
Standard gauge locomotives of Switzerland
5 ft gauge locomotives
Railway locomotives introduced in 2010
Electric locomotives of Germany
Electric locomotives of Austria
Bo′Bo′ electric locomotives of Europe